Felix Trofimovich Mikhailov (Russian: Феликс Трофимович Михайлов; 12 April 1930 – 22 February 2006) was a Russian psychologist.

In the 1980s he worked at the Institute of General and Pedagogical Psychology in Moscow under Vasily Davydov.

Works
 The Riddle of the Self (Russian, 1976, English translation 1980)
 ObschScestvennoe  soznanie i samosoznanie  individa (Social  Consciousness  and  the Self-Consciousness  of the Individual),  Moscow,  Nauka,  1990.

References

Psychologists from Moscow
1930 births
2006 deaths
20th-century psychologists